The Royal Malay Regiment is the premier unit of the Malaysian Army's two infantry regiments. At its largest, the Malay Regiment comprised 27 battalions. At present, three battalions are parachute trained and form part of the Malaysian Army Rapid Deployment Force. Another battalion has been converted into a mechanised infantry battalion while the remaining battalions are standard light infantry. The 1st Battalion Royal Malay Regiment acts as the ceremonial foot guards battalion for the Yang di-Pertuan Agong, and is usually accompanied by the Central Band of the Royal Malay Regiment. As its name suggests, the regiment only recruits ethnic Malays.

History

Beginning in 1920, Malay rulers led by Sultan Alang Iskandar Shah (Sultan of Perak), Tuanku Muhamad Ibni Yam Tuan Antah (Negeri Sembilan), Raja Chulan (Perak Royal Family), and Dato Abdullah Haji Dahan (Undang Luak Rembau) urged the British colonial office to raise an army regiment from the local population.  At the time various British and Indian Army battalions (including the Burma Rifles) provided security for the Malay States.  On 23 November 1932 the War Office approved the formation of the Malay Regiment as a locally raised regiment of the British Army.  Then on 23 January 1933, the Federal Consultative Council passed the Malay Regiment Act as Act No. 11.  Funding of $70,000 was also approved for the purchase of the Kong Sang Rubber Estate in Port Dickson for use as the Recruit Training Centre.

The regiment traces its origin back to 1933 and the 1st Experimental Company, a company of native Malays established as the beginning of a native military force in Malaya.  On 1 February 1933, 25 young Malay locals were chosen from 1,000 applicants as suitable recruits for the new regiment.  Formed on 1 March 1933 in the Haig Lines, Port Dickson, Negeri Sembilan, this Experimental Company began with the 25 recruits under Commanding Officer G. McBruce and Adjutant Captain K. G. Exham. The Regimental Sergeant Major was A. E. McCarthy, and E. Oldfield served as Quartermaster Sergeant.

At this stage, because the 'Company' was only an attempt to "find out how the Malays would react to military discipline". it was designated "Experimental". On 1 January 1935, the Experimental Company became the Malay Regiment with a complement of 150 men.  Recruitment then accelerated, and a further 232 recruits were formed into two rifle companies, as well as a headquarters wing that included a Vickers machine-gun platoon, a Signalling Section, and a Corps of Drums. As of 1 January 1938, the 1st Battalion Malay Regiment had a complement of 17 British officers, six Malay officers, 11 Warrant Officers, and 759 non-commissioned officers and other ranks. Training intensified as the shadow of war loomed larger with frequent long route marches and exercises at battalion and brigade levels. The regiment also began training with mortars and anti-tank weapons. In August 1941, a Bren gun carrier platoon was formed under Captain R. R. C. Carter and trained with the British 2nd Loyals Regiment.  In March 1941, the Colonial Governor of the Straits Settlements, authorised the increase of the regiment's strength to two battalions with the creation of The 2nd Battalion in 1941.  The two battalions of the Malay Regiment, along with the 2nd Battalion The Loyal Regiment (North Lancashire), formed the 1st Malaya Infantry Brigade and went on to play a major role in the defence of Malaya during the Second World War.

Company A of 2nd Battalion was the first Malay Regiment unit to engage Japanese forces landing at Kampung Salak in Pengkalan Chepa, Kelantan.  Outnumbered, the unit eventually withdrew to Kuala Krai, and later to Singapore.

Battle of Pasir Panjang Ridge

The first clash between the Malay Regiment and Japanese soldiers occurred on 13 February 1942 at around 1400 hrs when the Japanese 18th Division attacked the south-western coast along the Pasir Panjang Ridge and across Ayer Rajah Road. That morning, the Japanese 56th Infantry Regiment, with considerable artillery support, attacked.  B Company of 1st Battalion, Malay Regiment, defending their position on the ridge came under heavy fire from Japanese troops supported by artillery and tanks and were forced to retreat to the rear.  However, before their withdrawal was complete, the Japanese broke through B Company's position encircling the entire company.  When their ammunition ran out, B Company fought on savagely in hand-to-hand combat using bayonets.  Captain Yazid Ahmad of the Federated Malay States Volunteer Force, on secondment to the Malay Regiment, took over B Company.  They were reduced owing to mounting officer casualties: in a heroic and glorious last stand eclipsing the later achievements of 2nd Lieutenant Adnan Saidi. Captain Yazid died where he stood at the head of his men.  A few soldiers from B Company managed to break out from the encirclement while other survivors were captured and became prisoners-of-war.  The company's destruction triggered an immediate night withdrawal of both the 44th Indian and 1st Malaya Brigade to the general line running from Mount Echo (at the junction of Ayer Rajah and Depot Road) to Buona Vista.

Battle of Bukit Chandu
On 14 February, the Japanese launched a further heavy attack at 0830 hours, supported by intense mortar and artillery fire, on the front held by the 1st Malaya infantry Brigade. The fighting included bitter hand-to-hand combat with heavy losses on both sides. At 1600 hours, an attack supported by tanks eventually succeeded in penetrating the left flank where the defenders were forced back to a line from the junction of the Ayer Rajah and Depot Road through the Brick Works and along the canal to Bukit Chermin. Owing to the failure of units on both its flanks to hold their ground, the 1st Malaya Infantry Brigade withdrew at 1430 hours. At this point, the Malay Regiment's C Company were ordered to move to a new defence position, Pt. 226 at Bukit Chandu.  Had the Japanese gained control of the hill and ridge that overlooked the north of the island, it would have given them direct passage to the Alexandra area where the British army had its main ammunition and supply depots, a military hospital and other key installations.

Second Lieutenant Adnan Saidi and his men of 7 Platoon, C Company of the 1st Bn Malay Regiment made their well-known final stand against the Japanese attack on Bukit Chandu, now being commemorated as Reflections at Bukit Chandu.  Adnan Saidi's bravery was exemplified in the battle where he was killed along with many of the Malay Regiment in the last defensive battle at Pasir Panjang.  His motto "Biar Putih Tulang Jangan Putih Mata" is still remembered.  The translation loosely means, "it is better to die fighting than to live crying in regret till the eyes becomes blind."  In other words, "Death Before Dishonour".

Separated from D Company by a big canal on fire with oil flowing from Normanton Depot, C Company were prevented from retreating further south. C Company Commander Captain Rix died during the early part of the engagement whereupon command automatically passed to Second Lieutenant Adnan Saidi.

The Japanese troops pressed their attack on Bukit Chandu in the afternoon. Using deception, they sent a group of soldiers dressed in Punjabi uniforms to pass themselves off as Punjabi soldiers from the British army.  However Second Lieutenant Saidi saw through the ruse as British soldiers march in threes and Japanese soldiers march in fours.  When the disguised soldiers reached the Malay Regiment's defence line, C Company's squad opened fire with their Lewis machine guns, killing some and badly wounding the rest — those who survived rolled and crawled downhill to save themselves.  Four of the top marksmen in the previous years military competition held in Singapore were men from C Company.

Two hours later, the Japanese launched an all-out assault in great numbers despite being within point blank range of the Australian artillery. To save ammunition, the artillery did not open fire, a manoeuvre that greatly surprised the Japanese.  The shell that had been "saved" by the Australian artillery was handed over to the Japanese army the next day when General Percival surrendered Singapore to General Yamashita.
The Malay Regiment were soon overwhelmed by the attack.  Although greatly outnumbered and short of ammunition and supplies, they continued to put up resistance. Reports claimed that Lieutenant Saidi manned a Lewis machine gun others engaged in fierce hand-to-hand combat using only bayonets. Nevertheless, the troops stood their ground and frustrated the enemy.  Lt. Saidi was seriously wounded but refused to retreat; instead he encouraged his men to fight to the last, showing a disregard for personal danger that inspired the company to fight on.  Adnan was later captured and tortured before being bayoneted to death.

On 28 February 1942, four Malay Regiment officers taken prisoner were executed in Pasir Panjang by firing squad for refusing to join the Imperial Japanese Army when instructed to do so by Malay traitor Major Mustapha Hussein of the Fujiwara Kikan Japanese intelligence organisation.  They were Lieutenant (No.8) Ariffin Hj Sulaiman, Lieutenant (No.29) Abdul Wahid Jidin, Lieutenant (No.57) Abdullah Saad and Lieutenant (No.12) Ibrahim Sidek.  Lieutenant Ahmad Noordin of 'A' Company, 1st Battalion was executed earlier on 15 February 1942 while Lieutenant Muhammad Isa Mahmud of HQ Company, 1st Battalion was executed on 12 February 1943.  Most of the surviving captured Malay Regiment officers defected or joined the Imperial Japanese Army.

During the entire Malayan Campaign, but largely between 12 and 14 February 1942 in Singapore, the Malay Regiment suffered a total of 159 killed (six British officers, seven Malay officers, and 146 other ranks) and a large but unspecified number wounded. On the whole the British were not convinced that the Malays were a martial race in view of the widespread desertions among Malay Volunteer troops leading to most of the remaining Malay Volunteers being disarmed before they entered Johor and were ordered home. A small core of well trained and loyal Malay Volunteer officers and NCOs fought to the end in the defence of Singapore.

Reconstruction during the British Military Administration
By mid 1946, the idea of a multi-racial Malay Regiment, raised after the war, had been dropped due to opposition from state rules and governments. The all-Malay Malay Regiment would become part of a Federation Army of divisional strength thereby freeing up British regiments for other more strategic duties. The British plan to develop a strategic reserve of three brigades held in Britain would require the raising of more local regimental strength.

The Overseas Defence Committee thereafter endorsed a gradual expansion of the Malay Regiment to six battalions by 1950 whereby the Malay Regiment would be used mainly for internal security, with multi-racial formations in the supporting arms. But in fact by 1954 it reached seven battalions at the height of The Emergency.

The Malayan Emergency

By 1948, the British Army had seven partially reformed Gurkha battalions in Malaya, in addition to two battalions of the Malay Regiment.  By mid 1948, only three British battalions remained in Malaya to provide security to the Federation.  The Malay Regiment also played a major role against the communist guerrillas of the Malayan National Liberation Army (MNLA) when an eventual seven battalions served during the Emergency, with the 3rd battalion, which was raised in 1948.  During the campaigns privates carried a No.4 and No.5 .303 service rifle in sporting guise to hide it for jungle warfare.  A sling swivel on the side of the butt was one feature.  Another was the flash eliminator on the muzzle designed to mask firing with a bayonet to affix.

The regiment gained the 'royal' prefix in 1960 when many of its officers were still trained at RMA Sandhurst.  It became the Royal Malay Regiment and by 1961 had a strength of 11 battalions. The Sovereign's Colours were received in 1963, seven years after Malaysia became an independent country.

Indonesian confrontation

During the confrontation, the Royal Malay Regiment were also deployed in Sabah and Sarawak. During this deployment, the Kalabakan incident occurred on 29 December 1963. An outpost in Kalabakan in Tawau, established and manned by members of C Company of the 3rd Battalion under the command of Maj Zainal Abidin bin Haji Yaacob was ambushed by "volunteers" of the North Kalimantan Army while performing their Maghrib prayers. The company reacted and stood to, and were finally able to repel the attacking force. However, seven members of the company, including Major Zainal Abidin were killed and 16 others wounded.

Second Emergency

Lahad Datu Standoff

Serving the United Nations

Malayan Special Forces in Congo
The 4th Bn Royal Malay Regiment under the command of Lt Kol Ungku Nazaruddin formed the core of the Malayan Special Force that served under UN command in the Congo in 1960. In turn, the 6th Bn Royal Malay, 7th Bn Royal Malay and 2nd Bn Royal Malay also served in the Congo under UN command. 2nd Bn Royal Malay ended the Congo deployment on 28 April 1963 when they returned home.

Somalia
As part of the United Nations UNOSOM II operation in Somalia, the 19th Bn Royal Malay Regiment (Mechanised) started deployment of its 870 members in Mogadishu from 18 June 1993. The battalion was involved in the combat rescue of US Army Rangers during the Battle of Mogadishu together with Pakistan Army's 10th Battalion of the Baloch Regiment, where the battalion provided the Radpanzer Condor armoured personnel carriers for the QRF force of the 10th Mountain Division that effected the rescue. One member of the battalion, a driver of one of the APCs, Private Mat Aznan (posthumously promoted to Corporal) was killed and four APCs destroyed during the rescue.

Bosnia and Herzegovina
23rd Bn Royal Malay and 3rd Armour formed MALBATT I as part of the United Nations Protection Force and started deployment in September 1993. 23 Bn Royal Malay served until August 1994 and were replaced by MALBATT II comprising 5 Bn Royal Malay and 2nd Armour. MALBATT III (28 March 1995 – November 1995) was formed from 12 Bn Royal Malay and 1st Armour. Malcon 1 (2 Royal Ranger Regiment & 4th Armour), Malcon 2 (18 RMR & 2nd Armour), Malcon 4 (2 RMR & 1 Armour)

Regimental Crest
The Regiment's crest depicts a pair of tigers supporting an Oriental Crown. Within the circle of the crest are a kris and a scabbard with the Regimental motto "Ta'at Setia" written in Jawi, meaning "Loyal and True". Major G. McI. S. Bruce and Captain K. G. Exham, the founding officers of this Regiment, designed the crest.

Three colours were chosen – green (the Muslim colour), yellow (for Malay royalty) and red (for the British Army influence).

Royal Guards
 Istana Negara, Kuala Lumpur

Battle honours
 Second World War:
 Tanah Melayu 1941–42
 Singapura 1942
 Darurat 1948–1960
 Konfrontasi 1963–1965 – Confrontation with Indonesia
 Battle of Mogadishu, Somalia 1993–1995
 Bosnia 1993–1998
 Namibia 1989–1990
 Cambodia 1992–1993
 Congo 1960–1963
East Timor - Operation Astute 2006
 Lahad Datu 2013

UN Peacekeeping missions
 Democratic Republic of the Congo 1960–1963 – UN Peacekeeping
 Namibia 1989–1990 – UN Peacekeeping
 Cambodia 1992–1993 – UN Peacekeeping mission (UNTAC)
 Bosnia and Herzegovina 1993–1998 – UN Peacekeeping

Alliances

  – The Royal Australian Regiment
  – The Royal Anglian Regiment; 1st Bn
  – The Duke of Lancaster's Regiment (King's Lancashire and Border); 2nd Bn
  – The Royal Welsh; 4th Bn
  – The Royal Scots Borderers; 5th Bn
  – The Rifles; 6th Bn
  – The Royal Gurkha Rifles
  – The Royal New Zealand Infantry Regiment; 7th Bn

Battalions
The RAMD has a total of 27 battalions. 21 of these are standard light infantry battalions, with two roled as mechanised infantry and three as parachute infantry. The final battalion is a support unit.

1st Battalion Royal Malay Regiment

The 1st Bn Royal Malay is the most senior infantry battalion of the Regiment. This was also the battalion group to which Lieutenant Adnan Bin Saidi was posted. In 2008, the 1st Battalion became the first all-Muslim unit to provide the Queen's Guard at Buckingham Palace as well as the first guard from a nation that was not a Commonwealth realm. Its primary role is as the foot guards unit stationed at the Istana Negara in Kuala Lumpur, the national capital city, as well as in the premises of the Ministry of Defence Building. Primarily the battalion's responsibilities are to perform public duties within the capital in support of ceremonial events.

5th Battalion Royal Malay Regiment
5 Bn Royal Malay regiment was an Allied regiment of the King's Own Scottish Borderers Regiment (KOSB) of the British Army. The Alliance was formed during 1st Bn KOSB's service in Malaya during the Malayan Emergency. Several traditions of KOSB are retained by the 5 Bn. The shoulder flash of officers and men of 5 Bn follows the regimental colours of KOSB.

5 Bn also maintains the tradition of having a bagpipe platoon. The tradition started when an officer of KOSB was seconded to 5 Bn Royal Malay in 1953. 5 Bn have just then formed a pipe platoon. The Scottish officer introduced the bagpipe and helped train the pipers, and the bagpipe platoon was formed. To this day, the bagpipe platoons of both battalions maintained their alliance. The bagpipe platoon has, in the past, been invited to attend the Edinburgh Festival. The last time 5 Bn attended the festival was in January 1990, celebrating the KOSB's 300th anniversary.

6th Battalion Royal Malay Regiment
The 6th battalion, Royal Malay Regiment was formed on 1 May 1952 and later deployed to Quetta Camp in Kluang, Johor on 3 November 1952. Though formed on 1 May, the official date for the formation of the battalion is recorded as 3 November 1952. On its formation, the 6th Battalion had British officers from the 1st Battalion of the Dorset and Devonshire Regiment seconded to form the command core of the battalion.

The seconded officers were gradually replaced by Malay officers and in early 1954, 21 of the 26 officers of the battalion consisted of Malay officers replacing their British counterparts. Jeneral (Rtd) Tun Ibrahim Ismail was the first Malay Commanding Officer of the battalion, taking command from 11 August 1958 until 14 June 1960. He later went on to become the first Malay Chief of the Malaysian Armed Forces (now called Chief of Defence Forces)

The battalion is a Standard Infantry Battalion of the Malaysian Army. The battalion has participated in the Kris Mere exercises with the New Zealand Army the battalion was also deployed to The Congo as part of the Malayan Special Force serving under the United Nations Command.

7th Battalion Royal Malay Regiment

7 Bn Royal Malay Regiment is a mechanized unit of the RMR. It is currently allied with the Royal New Zealand Infantry Regiment of the New Zealand Defence Force. It is currently based at Kukusan Camp in Tawau, Sabah

17th Battalion Royal Malay Regiment
The 17th Battalion, Royal Malay Regiment (17 RAMD) was formed on 1 August 1970. It is an elite force of paratroopers assigned to the Malaysian Army's 10th Parachute Brigade. On 10 October 1994, 17th PARA undertook a rapid deployment exercise, supported by elements of the Malaysian Special Forces Group (Gerup Gerak Khas) and PASKAL, as well as operational support from the Royal Malaysian Navy and Royal Malaysian Air Force. The exercise centred around a scenario of the retaking of Langkawi International Airport from an invading force by the Rapid Deployment Force spearheaded by the paratroopers.

27th Battalion Royal Malay Regiment
Newly activated standard infantry battalion, 27th Royal Malay Regiment (27 RAMD) will be placed under the formation of the 5th Infantry Brigade, 5th Malaysian Infantry Division based at the West Coast of Sabah, Malaysia.

Notable people

Lieutenant Adnan Bin Saidi
Adnan Saidi led the reinforced 42-strong No.7 Platoon of 'C' Company, 1st Battalion of the Malay Regiment at the Bukit Chandu (Opium Hill) position on 12–14 February 1942. Although heavily outnumbered, Adnan refused to surrender and urged his men to fight until the end. They held off the Japanese for two days amid heavy enemy shelling and shortages of food and ammunition. Adnan was shot but carried on fighting. After the battle was lost, the wounded Adnan was taken prisoner by Japanese soldiers, who tied him to a cherry tree and bayoneted him to death. According to some, he was also slashed and his body parts were burnt. Adnan epitomises the bravery and tenacity of the Malay Regiment. Because of this, he is considered a hero by many Malaysians and Singaporeans today.

Captain Hamid Bin Awang
Based on intelligence gathered indicating that a force of 40 to 50 communist guerrillas of the would converge on Gunung Pueh, "D" Company of 2nd Royal Malay Regiment led by Captain Hamid was tasked in a search and destroy mission.

On April 7, 1973, Captain Hamid and his company detected a communist guerrilla encampment. He organised his company for an assault on the camp. Captain Hamid fired a round of M79 grenade launcher to mark the start of the attack and rushed into the communist guerrillas camp. In the heat of battle, a communist guerrilla tried to shoot down one of Captain Hamid's men. Captain Hamid immediately rushed to the guerrilla and hit him in the back of the neck with his grenade launcher's butt.

Captain Hamid's company scored three kills and captured three enemy weapons, as well as ammunition and assorted equipment. Captain Hamid's company suffered one KIA. Captain Hamid was awarded the SP on 6 June 1973.

See also

 Royal Ranger Regiment (Rejimen Renjer DiRaja)
 The Royal Malay Regiment during the changing of the guard in London

References

https://www.airtimes.my/2020/09/12/tentera-darat-malaysia-tubuh-briged-infantri-perkukuh-pertahanan-sabah/

Further reading
 Dol Ramli. (1965, July). 'History of the Malay Regiment, 1933–1942'. Journal of the Malaysian Branch of the Royal Asiatic Society, 38(1), 199–243.
 
 
 M.C. Sheppard, The Malay Regiment 1933-1947 Dept Malay PR, Malaya Peninsula (1947)

Malaysia Army corps and regiments
British Malaya
Military history of Malaysia
British colonial regiments
Military of Singapore under British rule
Military units and formations established in 1933
Malayan Emergency
1932 establishments in British Malaya
Military units and formations of British Malaya in World War II
Malaysian monarchy
Guards of honour